Okeechobee County is a county located in the Florida Heartland region of the state of Florida. As of the 2020 census, the population was 39,644. The county seat is Okeechobee.

The County of Okeechobee comprises the Okeechobee, FL Micropolitan Statistical Area, which is included in the Miami-Fort Lauderdale-Port St. Lucie, FL Combined Statistical Area.

History

Okeechobee County was incorporated in 1917. It was named for Lake Okeechobee, which was itself named for the Seminole Indian words okee (water) and chobee (big).

Historic buildings
Historic buildings in Okeechobee County include:
 First United Methodist Church, 1924
 Freedman-Raulerson House, 1923
 Okeechobee County Courthouse, 1926

Geography

Adjacent counties

 Indian River County - northeast
 Martin County - east
 St. Lucie County - east
 Glades County - southwest
 Hendry County - southwest
 Highlands County - west
 Polk County - northwest
 Osceola County - northwest

Points of interest
The Lake Okeechobee Scenic Trail, part of the Florida National Scenic Trail, runs along the Herbert Hoover Dike around the Lake.

Transportation

Airports
 Okeechobee County Airport

Major highways

Demographics

As of the 2020 United States census, there were 39,644 people, 14,601 households, and 9,837 families residing in the county.

As of the census of 2010, there were 39,996 people, 13,857 households, and 9,016 families residing in the county. There were 15,504 housing units at an average density of 52 per square mile (8/km2). The racial makeup of the county was 87.9% White, 8.6% Black or African American, 1.3% Native American, 0.9% Asian, 0.1% Pacific Islander, and 1.2% from two or more races.  24.5% of the population were Hispanic or Latino of any race.

In 2005 68.5% of the county population was White non-Hispanic, 21.6% of the population was Latino, 8.0% was African-American and both Native Americans and Asians constituted 0.9% of the population.

In 2000 there were 12,593 households, out of which 30.40% had children under the age of 18 living with them, 55.50% were married couples living together, 10.70% had a female householder with no husband present, and 28.40% were non-families. 21.50% of all households were made up of individuals, and 10.10% had someone living alone who was 65 years of age or older.  The average household size was 2.69 and the average family size was 3.07.

In the county in 2000 the population was spread out, with 25.20% under the age of 18, 9.50% from 18 to 24, 27.10% from 25 to 44, 21.90% from 45 to 64, and 16.30% who were 65 years of age or older.  The median age was 37 years. For every 100 females, there were 115.50 males.  For every 100 females age 18 and over, there were 115.20 males.

In 2010 the median income for a household in the county was $36,929, and the median income for a family was $35,163. Males had a median income of $25,574 versus $20,160 for females. The per capita income for the county was $14,553.  About 11.80% of families and 16.00% of the population were below the poverty line, including 19.90% of those under age 18 and 10.30% of those age 65 or over.

Libraries
Okeechobee County is part of the Heartland Library Cooperative which serves Okeechobee County and some of the surrounding counties, including Glades, Highlands, Hardee, and DeSoto. The seven-branch library system has one branch in the city of Okeechobee.

Communities

City
 Okeechobee

Census-designated places
 Cypress Quarters
 Taylor Creek

Other unincorporated communities

 Ancient Oaks
 Barber Quarters
 Basinger
 Basswood Estates
 Country Hills Estates
 Deans Court
 Dixie Ranch Acres
 Duberry Gardens
 Echo Estates
 Everglades
 Fort Drum
 Four Seasons
 Hilolo
 Mildred
 Oak Park
 Okeechobee Little Farms
 Quail Acres
 Rookerville
 Sherman
 Taylor Creek Isle
 Treasure Island
 Viking Estates
 Upthegrove Beach
 Whispering Pines

Politics

Voter registration
According to the Secretary of State's office, Republicans are a majority of registered voters in Okeechobee County.

See also
 Florida Heartland
 National Register of Historic Places listings in Okeechobee County, Florida
 Treasure Coast

External links

Governmental
 Board of County Commissioners
 Okeechobee County Board of County Commissioners
 Constitutional Officers
 Okeechobee County Clerk
 Okeechobee County Supervisor of Elections
 Okeechobee County Property Appraiser
 Okeechobee County Sheriff's Office
 Okeechobee County Tax Collector
  School district
 School Board of Okeechobee County
 Countywide District
 Okeechobee Soil and Water Conservation District
 Multi-county Districts
 Indian River Community College
 South Florida Water Management District
 St. Johns River Water Management District
 Heartland Library Cooperative
 Tampa Bay Library Consortium
 Judicial
 Okeechobee County Clerk of Courts
  Public Defender, 19th Judicial Circuit of Florida
  State Attorney, 19th Judicial Circuit of Florida 
  Circuit and County Courts for the 19th Judicial Circuit of Florida

Non-governmental
 Okeechobee Official Discussion Forum
 D.R. Wilson Land Company
 Okeechobee County Tourist Development Council
 Okeechobee County Guide
 Okeechobee News local newspaper for Okeechobee County, Florida fully and openly available in the Florida Digital Newspaper Library

References

 
Florida counties
Florida placenames of Native American origin
1917 establishments in Florida
Populated places established in 1917
Micropolitan areas of Florida